Pim Johannes Thomas van Strien (born 29 April 1977) is a Dutch politician of the conservative liberal People's Party for Freedom and Democracy (VVD). He has been serving as a member of the House of Representatives since the 2021 general election, and he has previously worked as a press officer for the VVD and the Ministry of Economic Affairs and Climate Policy.

Early life and career 
Van Strien was born in 1977 in the North Brabant city of Tilburg. He attended Concord College in the English county of Shropshire in the years 1993–95 before studying international law at Maastricht University. Van Strien was a member of the student association Circumflex and its debating society Ambiorix, and he interned at the United Nations as part of the staff of Secretary-General Kofi Annan.

He worked at the Ministry of Foreign Affairs and took a job at the VVD in 2006, initially serving as a political adviser and later as a press officer. Van Strien became chief spokesperson for Minister of Economic Affairs Henk Kamp (VVD) in 2014 after having served as one of his spokespeople for one year. Starting in 2018, he led the Ministry of Economic Affairs and Climate Policy's communication strategy and external affairs department.

Van Strien was the VVD's 31st candidate in the 2021 general election and was elected to the House of Representatives with 463 preference votes. He was sworn in on 31 March. Van Strien's specialties in the House are the knowledge economy, industrial policy, economic innovation, media, and culture, and he is on the Committees for Digital Affairs; for Economic Affairs and Climate Policy; for Education, Culture and Science; and for Foreign Trade and Development Cooperation (vice chair). He is also on the House's contact groups Germany, United Kingdom, and United States and on its delegation to the Benelux Parliament. In June 2021, when during the COVID-19 pandemic infections with the coronavirus were declining in the Netherlands, Van Strien called on the government to grant more permits for festivals and other cultural activities to support the struggling cultural sector.

Personal life 
While a House of Representatives member, Van Strien moved from the Amsterdam borough of Westerpark to Haarlem. He has a girlfriend and two sons, who were born in 2017 and 2020.

References

External links 
 Campaign website 

1977 births
21st-century Dutch civil servants
21st-century Dutch politicians
Living people
Maastricht University alumni
Members of the House of Representatives (Netherlands)
People's Party for Freedom and Democracy politicians
Political spokespersons
Political staffers
Politicians from Amsterdam
People educated at Concord College, Acton Burnell